Jeffrey Joseph Brubaker (born February 24, 1958) is an American former professional ice hockey forward.

Brubaker was the first Maryland native to play in the NHL although he grew up and learned to play hockey in Lansing, Michigan. He started his National Hockey League career with the Hartford Whalers in 1979. He would also play with the Montreal Canadiens, Calgary Flames, Toronto Maple Leafs, Edmonton Oilers, New York Rangers, and Detroit Red Wings.  He retired after the 1989 season.

Brubaker began his coaching career in the ECHL with the 1989-90 Greensboro Monarchs, with his team winning the league championship that same year.

Career statistics

References

External links

1958 births
Living people
Adirondack Red Wings players
American men's ice hockey left wingers
Binghamton Whalers players
Boston Bruins draft picks
Calgary Flames players
Colorado Flames players
Colorado Rangers players
Detroit Red Wings players
Edmonton Oilers players
Hartford Whalers players
Hershey Bears players
Ice hockey people from Maryland
Ice hockey players from Michigan
Michigan State Spartans men's ice hockey players
Montreal Canadiens players
New England Whalers players
New York Rangers players
Nova Scotia Oilers players
Nova Scotia Voyageurs players
Sportspeople from Hagerstown, Maryland
Peterborough Petes (ice hockey) players
Rochester Americans players
Sportspeople from Lansing, Michigan
Springfield Indians players
Toronto Maple Leafs players